The Reckless Sex is a 1925 American melodrama film directed by Alan James from a screenplay by Travers Wells.  The film stars Madge Bellamy, William Collier Jr., and Wyndham Standing.

Plot 
Robert Lanning Jr. is sent by his father in Boston to his ranch in New Mexico to stop the employees from smuggling firearms across the Mexico–United States border. During the voyage Lanning Jr. picks up stage actress Mary Hamilton from a roadshow production of Uncle Tom's Cabin, but believes she is a child because she is in character as Eva St. Claire. At the ranch he and the Rurales stops the gun smugglers, and after he realizes Mary is an adult he successfully proposes to her.

Cast
 Madge Bellamy as Mary Hamilton
 William Collier Jr. as Juan
 Wyndham Standing as Carter Trevor
 Claire McDowell as Concha
 Johnnie Walker as Robert Lanning, Jr.
 Gertrude Astor as Lucile Dupré
 Alec B. Francis as Emanuel García
 Gladys Brockwell as Mrs. García
 David Torrence as Robert Lanning
 Helen Dunbar
 Walter Long

References

1920s English-language films
American black-and-white films
1925 drama films
Melodrama films
Films set in New Mexico
Films set in Boston
Films directed by Alan James
1920s American films